Missouri wine refers to wine made from grapes grown in Missouri. German immigrants in the early-to-mid-19th century founded the wine industry in Missouri, resulting in its wine corridor being called the Missouri "Rhineland". Later Italian immigrants also entered wine production. In the mid-1880s, more wine was produced by volume in Missouri than in any other state. Before prohibition, Missouri was the second-largest wine-producing state in the nation. Missouri had the first area recognized as a federally designated American Viticultural Area with  the Augusta AVA acknowledged on June 20, 1980.  There are now four AVAs in Missouri. In 2017 there were 125 wineries operating in the state of Missouri, up from 92 in 2009.

History
German immigrants to the Missouri River valley established vineyards and wineries on both sides of the river. Hermann, Missouri, settled by Germans in 1837, had ideal conditions to grow grapes for wine. Stone Hill Winery in Hermann became the second largest in the nation (and the third-largest in the world), shipping a million barrels of wine by the turn of the 20th century. Its wines won awards at world fairs in Vienna in 1873 and Philadelphia in 1876.

In the mid-19th century, the phylloxera louse destroyed much of the Vitis vinifera grape crop in Europe, especially France, after a Frenchman transferred American wine grapes carrying phylloxera to France.  Missouri's state entomologist, Charles Riley, found that American rootstocks were resistant to the pest.  He directed selling millions of rootstocks to vineyards around the world, to which their grape varieties could be grafted.  This saved the French wine industry as well as others.  The city of Montpellier erected statues honoring these events, as well as Riley's scientific colleague J.É. Planchon.

Before Prohibition, Missouri was the second-largest wine-producing state in the nation.  The new amendment forced the shutdown or abandonment of all wineries except that at St. Stanislaus Seminary, in Florissant, which was permitted to make sacramental wines.  The wine industry was destroyed for decades.

Revival of the state's wine industry started in 1965 with the reopening of Stone Hill Winery in Hermann, followed soon by the opening of Mount Pleasant Winery in Augusta on the north side of the river.  Soon winemakers began to reestablish Missouri vineyards and wineries along the river and throughout the state.

The federal government has recognized the importance of winemaking to regional and national economies.  The region received the first certification issued by the U.S. government as a distinct American Viticultural Area (AVA) in 1972.  This certification recognizes their qualities of soil, climate and other unique characteristics that help create identifiable wines.  One distinct area was developed on the north side of the Missouri River in southwestern St. Charles County.  The Augusta AVA was recognized in 1980.  The Hermann AVA, on the south side of the river chiefly in Gasconade County, was designated by the federal government in 1983.

Italian as well as German immigrants introduced wine production in the Rolla, Missouri area. This is now within the Ozark Highlands AVA, designated in 1987 and including parts of several counties, from southern Gasconade County to Texas and Dent counties further south.

All three smaller AVAs are within the Ozark Mountain AVA, a designation covering southern  Missouri below the Missouri River, northwestern Arkansas, and northeastern Oklahoma.

Grapes varieties

Missouri's climate, with its long, hot summers, good sun exposure, and thin rocky Ozarks soil, is excellent for growing grapes.  The moderate average temperature allows natural cellaring of wine.

The most prominent Missouri-grown variety is Cynthiana/Norton, believed to be a variety of Vitis aestivalis.  Other varieties grown include native American grapes, Concord and Catawba, as well as French-American hybrids such as Vignoles, Seyval, and Chambourcin.  Recently, there has been more interest in planting Vitis vinifera grapes varieties, especially the fine European grapes: Cabernet Franc, Chardonnay, Petit Verdot and Mourvedre.

Industry

The wine industry in Missouri is growing rapidly.  Missouri has more than  planted in grapes.   In 2008 over 888,000 gallons of Missouri wine was sold. The market share of Missouri wine within the state was 7.95% in 2008. The wine industry in Missouri has consistently grown for over a decade, in 2009 97 wineries were producing select Missouri wines. These were supported by over 400 local vineyards.
Missouri's winery count was over 126 by 2016. Many of these are small "mom and pop" wineries that have become favorite day-trip sites for many. The four largest wineries in Missouri are (in order): St. James Winery, Stone Hill Winery, Les Bourgeois Winery, and Meramec Vineyards Winery.  Missouri is home to five wine trails which host wine events and festivals year round and encourage weekend getaways to some of the established wine regions in the state.

A state tax on wine imposed in 1984, now 12 cents per gallon, supports the state Missouri Wine and Grape Program, which provides scientific and marketing support for Missouri wines. The state hired a viticulturalist to assist in restoring the wine industry. Missouri State University's fruit experiment station began working with winemakers to determine grape varieties suitable for Missouri's climate.  The state government hopes to encourage the local wine industry by promoting Missouri regionalism: integrating grape agriculture with winemaking, the restaurant business, and tourism.

Missouri State University's Mountain Grove Cellars, part of the Missouri State University - Mountain Grove Campus Fruit Experimentation Station - is a wholly university-owned and operated wine grape producing vineyard.

The University of Missouri's Grape and Wine Institute (GWI) researches best winemaking and grape growing practices and how they impact the growth of the wine industry in Missouri and the Midwest.  The University of Missouri has had some interest in developing a grape-growing education program.  Many of the grape growers and winemakers received some instruction  from California universities to supplement their studies.

See also
Missouri Rhineland
List of wineries in Missouri

References

External links
 Missouri Wine and Grape Program
 United States Department of Agriculture report on the Missouri wine industry (PDF)
 ShowMeWine.org - A Guide to Missouri Wine

 
Missouri Rhineland
Wine regions of the United States by state
Economy of Missouri
Agriculture in Missouri
Cuisine of St. Louis